J. Ed Morgan is an American politician who served in the Mississippi State Senate from the 45th district from 2004 until 2008.

Education and professional career 

Morgan attended University of Alabama and Jackson School of Law at Mississippi College. His professional background is in construction.

Political career 
Morgan was mayor of Hattiesburg, MS from 1989 until 2001.

Morgan served as a member of the Mississippi Senate from 2004 to 2008. As a Senator, Morgan served on the Fees, Salaries & Administration, Finance Judiciary, Division B, Ports and Marine Resources, Public Health & Welfare and Universities & Colleges committees.

Personal life 

Morgan has four children.

References 

Mississippi Republicans
1947 births
Living people
University of Alabama alumni
Mississippi College alumni